The 301st Military Intelligence Battalion is located in Phoenix, Arizona.

Lineage
 Constituted 6 June 1949 in the Organized Reserve Corps as Headquarters, 301st Military Intelligence Platoon.
 Activated 22 June 1949 at Austin, Texas
 Reorganized and redesignated 1 September 1950 as Headquarters, 301st Military Intelligence Battalion.
 Organized Reserve Corps redesignated 9 July 1952 as the Army Reserve.
 Battalion Inactivated 23 February 1953 at Austin, Texas
 Redesignated 16 September 1988 as Headquarters, Headquarters and Service Company, 301st Military Intelligence Battalion, and activated at Pasadena, Texas(organic elements concurrently constituted and activated)
 Battalion inactivated 15 September 1997 at Pasadena, Texas
 Activated 16 April 2005 with headquarters at Phoenix, Arizona

Mission
The 301st Military Intelligence Theater Support Battalion (301st MI TSB) is a MIRC-aligned Reserve Intelligence Battalion focused on providing highly trained intelligence Soldiers to facilitate and integrate into military units mobilized around the world. The 301st also trains and prepares for mobilization as a support battalion, focusing on the Pacific Theater under the 500th MI BDE.

301st currently provides training and specialization in the following Intelligence Sections:
All-Source, Counter-Intelligence, Human Intelligence, Signals Intelligence, Geospatial Intelligence, and Technical Intelligence.

Unit structure
The 301st MI (TSB) is made up of four companies:
 Headquarters/Headquarters Detachment: Includes the primary Command Staff, Shops, Logistical and Mechanical support staff.
 Alpha Company: Consists primarily of All-Source, Geospatial, and Signals Intelligence Soldiers with the Emphasis of Fusion Intelligence.
 Bravo Company: Consists of All-Source, Geospatial, Counterintelligence, Signals, and Human Intelligence Soldiers.
 Charlie Company:

Honors
 Campaign Participation Credit: Alpha Company – Iraqi Service Streamer
 Decorations: none

External links
 Unit Facebook Page
 http://www.inscom.army.mil/MSC/500MIB/301st.html
 http://www.history.army.mil/html/forcestruc/lineages/branches/mi/0301mibn.htm 
 http://unitpages.military.com/unitpages/unit.do?id=104929

Organizations based in Phoenix, Arizona
301